The Brazil men's national volleyball team is governed by the Confederação Brasileira de Voleibol (Brazilian Volleyball Confederation) and takes part in international volleyball competitions. Brazil has three gold medals at the Olympic Games, won three times the World Championship and nine times the World League. Brazil is the #3 team on the FIVB World Rankings. The team is often referred to as volleyball's "Dream Team" due to its success under coach Bernardo Rezende.

Performance history

2000-until now
After the sixth place in the Sydney Olympic Games, the Brazilian men’s national team underwent some important changes ahead of the 2001 season. Mr. Bernardo Rezende, nicknamed Bernardinho, who had spent six years coaching the women's national team, was chosen to be the head coach of the Brazilian men's national team. In the first season with Bernardinho, the team conquered three gold medals (World League, America's Cup and South American Championship) and one silver medal (World Grand Champions Cup). In 2002, Brazil finished second in the World League after losing the title at home idc in the match against Russia. But in that same season, they conquered the World Championship for the first time ever.

The beginning of the 2003 season was very special for the World Champions. In an exciting final match against Serbia and Montenegro, Brazil won the World League gold medal for the third time, beating its opponent 3–2 in Madrid. After that, the team was defeated by Venezuela in the semifinal of the Pan American Games in Santo Domingo (Dominican Republic) and ended up with the bronze in the competition. However, the Brazilian squad beat Venezuela by 3–0 in the South American Championship final only one month later. That year ended with Brazil conquering the last title it had not won yet: the World Cup, in Japan.

In 2004, Bernardinho led the Brazilian team to a fourth title of the World League. In August, the Brazilian men's team won the second Olympic gold medal of its history, which happened in Athens in 2004 (the first one was conquered in Barcelona in 1992). In the final, Brazil beat Italy 3–1.

In the 2005 season, the Olympic Champion won four medals. In the final match against Serbia and Montenegro, Brazil won another gold medal in the World League, beating its opponent 3–1. After that, the team became second in the America's Cup, defeated by the United States in the final. Then in the South American Championship, Brazil conquered its 25th title, winning all matches and losing just one set. To end this great season, Bernardo Rezende’s team secured the gold medal in the World Grand Champions Cup in Japan. During the year 2006, the Brazilian team won a sixth title in the World League and a second title in the World Championship. 
This team was considered by many the best and most consistent men's volleyball team of all time.

Medals

Tournament record

Olympic Games
 Champions   Runners up   Third place
 Fourth place

World Championship
 Champions   Runners up   Third place
 Fourth place

World Cup
 Champions   Runners up   Third place   Fourth place

World Grand Champions Cup
 Champions   Runners up   Third place   Fourth place

World League
 1st   2nd   3rd

Nations League

 1st   2nd   3rd

Pan American Games
 Champions   Runners up   Third place   Fourth place

Pan-American Cup
 Champions   Runners up   Third place   Fourth place

South American Championship
 1st   2nd   3rd

America's Cup
 Champions   Runners up   Third place   Fourth place

U23 team

World Championship
  Gold: 1 time: 2013

U21 team

World Championship
  Gold: 4 times: 1993, 2001, 2007, 2009
  Silver: 6 times: 1981, 1995, 1997, 2003, 2005, 2013
  Bronze: 3 times: 1977, 1989, 1999

South American Championship
  Gold: 18 times: 1972, 1974, 1976, 1978, 1984, 1986, 1988, 1990, 1992, 1994, 1996, 1998, 2002, 2004, 2006, 2010, 2012, 2014
  Silver: 4 times: 1980, 1982, 2000, 2008

U19 team

World Championship
  Gold: 6 times: 1989, 1991, 1993, 1995, 2001, 2003
  Silver: 1 time: 2005

South American Championship
  Gold: 16 times: 1978, 1980, 1982, 1984, 1986, 1988, 1990, 1992, 1994, 1996, 1998, 2002, 2002, 2004, 2006, 2012
  Silver: 3 times: 2008, 2010, 2014

U17 team

South American Championship
  Gold: 1 time: 2011
  Silver: 1 time: 2013

Team

Current squad

The following is the Brazilian roster in the 2022 FIVB Volleyball Men's World Championship.

Head coach:  Renan Dal Zotto

Coaches history
  Bebeto de Freitas (1984–1988)
  José Roberto Guimarães (1991–1996)
  Radamés Lattari (1997-2001)
  Bernardo Rezende (2001–2016)
  Renan Dal Zotto (2017–)

Gallery

Fans

Records
Incidentally, the Maracana Stadium holds the all-time volleyball attendance record when 95,000 turned out to watch Brazil beat the USSR in an open-air friendly game in 1983.

Stadium
Ginásio do Maracanãzinho and Ginásio Municipal Tancredo Neves Brazil national team training and hosting venues.

Kit providers
The table below shows the history of kit providers for the Brazil national volleyball team.

Sponsorship
Primary sponsors include: main sponsors like Banco do Brasil, Nivea, other sponsors: Globoesporte, Gatorade, Gol Transportes Aereos, Delta Air Lines, Mikasa, Ernst & Young and Asics.

Media
Brazil's matches and friendlies are currently televised by SporTV and Globo.

See also

Brazil women's national volleyball team
Brazil men's national under-23 volleyball team
Brazil men's national under-21 volleyball team
Brazil men's national under-19 volleyball team

References

External links
Official website
FIVB profile

 
National men's volleyball teams
Volleyball in Brazil
V
Men's sport in Brazil